Kelsey Bruce (born October 27, 1992) is an American long-distance runner. In 2019, she competed in the women's marathon at the 2019 World Athletics Championships held in Doha, Qatar. She finished in 38th place.

In 2018, she competed in the 2018 New York City Marathon.

References

External links 
 

Living people
1992 births
Place of birth missing (living people)
American female long-distance runners
American female marathon runners
World Athletics Championships athletes for the United States
21st-century American women